The Peoria Javelinas are a baseball team that plays in the West Division of the Arizona Fall League. The Javelinas play their home games in the Peoria Sports Complex in Peoria, Arizona. The ballpark is also the spring training facility for the San Diego Padres and the Seattle Mariners. The team was established in 1992 as the Tucson Javelinas, and played for two seasons under that name. The Javelinas have won the most championships, seven, of any team in the Arizona Fall League, most recently in 2018.

History
For the 2011 season, Major League Baseball teams sending players to the Javelinas were: the Milwaukee Brewers, New York Mets, San Diego Padres, St. Louis Cardinals, and Seattle Mariners. For 2012 the Minnesota Twins and Cincinnati Reds were added while the Mets and Cardinals were dropped. For 2013 and 2014 the Javelinas played their games at Surprise Stadium while the Peoria Sports Complex underwent renovations. In 2013, the Houston Astros and Kansas City Royals replaced the Twins and Reds. In 2014 the Atlanta Braves, Cleveland Indians, Kansas City Royals, St. Louis Cardinals, and Tampa Bay Rays sent players to the Javelinas and the usual "home" teams of San Diego and Seattle did not. However, for 2015, the Javelinas returned to Peoria Sports Complex and the line up includes the Padres and Mariners along with the Atlanta Braves, Baltimore Orioles, and Cincinnati Reds.

Notable alumni

Nate Freiman, first baseman for the Oakland A's
Max Fried, pitcher for the Atlanta Braves
Jason Giambi, first baseman for the Cleveland Indians
Didi Gregorius, shortstop for the Philadelphia Phillies
Todd Helton, first baseman for the Colorado Rockies
Kenley Jansen, pitcher for the Atlanta Braves
Jason Kipnis, second baseman for the Cleveland Indians
Ryan Lavarnway, catcher for the Baltimore Orioles
Kevin Quackenbush, pitcher for the Cincinnati Reds
Mike Scioscia, manager of the Los Angeles Angels
Dustin Ackley, second baseman and outfielder for the Seattle Mariners
Ronald Acuña, outfielder for the Atlanta Braves
Tyler O'Neill, outfielder for the St. Louis Cardinals

Roster

See also
 Arizona Fall League#Results by season

References

External links

Arizona Fall League teams
Professional baseball teams in Arizona
Sports in Peoria, Arizona
Sports in Maricopa County, Arizona
1992 establishments in Arizona
Baseball teams established in 1992